, or Cereza, is the titular protagonist of the Bayonetta video game series developed by PlatinumGames. She was created by Hideki Kamiya and designed by Mari Shimazaki. Hellena Taylor voiced the character in English for the first two games and several appearances outside the series from 2009 to 2018, while Jennifer Hale voiced her in Bayonetta 3 (2022). She is voiced by Atsuko Tanaka in Japanese.

Bayonetta is one of only two surviving Umbra Witches, being the child of a Witch and a Lumen Sage. During the events of the first game, she goes in search of her forgotten past, heading for her old home of Vigrid and fighting the angelic forces of Paradiso on the way. In Bayonetta 2, she becomes a demon hunter confronting her own literal demons. She appears as a guest character in other games such as Anarchy Reigns, The Wonderful 101, the Super Smash Bros. series, and Shin Megami Tensei: Liberation Dx2.

Reception of the character has been positive overall, with the common point of praise being her highly feminine image, which makes her both stand out among female characters in video games and go against several set conventions.

Conception and design

Given the suggestion to create another action game by producer Yusuke Hashimoto, project director Hideki Kamiya decided to create a female lead, having felt he had already done all that could be done with male protagonists. To this end, he told character designer Mari Shimazaki to create her with three traits: a female lead, a modern witch, and to use four guns. Her name was inspired by a bayonet, meant to imply there was "more to her than meets the eye", while her four guns were named parsley, sage, rosemary and thyme after the old English ballad, "Scarborough Fair", due to Kamiya's love of folk music. The process, which took a full year, went through a hundred character designs and alterations, with early appearances resembling a traditional witch, with a frayed black outfit and a "veil-like look" on her head. The outfit color persisted, described by Shimazaki as being her "theme color" due to being a witch. She was given longer legs and arms to make her more appealing as an action-game character, countering what Shimazaki felt was a trend of female characters in such games having short and thin limbs. Her limbs and the rest of her design were appealing to Kamiya, and development proceeded on the character's attire.

Bayonetta's beehive hairstyle in the first game was an aspect Shimazaki insisted on, using it as an alternative to the usual pointed hat seen on witches. However, despite concerns, Kamiya had no qualms about the hairstyle one way or another. She was additionally given glasses at Kamiya's insistence, intended to differentiate her from other female characters as well as give her a "sense of mystery and intelligence", though Shimazaki attributed it to possibly his preference for women with glasses. Her guns were modeled after a derringer pistol, in order to remain convincing and familiar, as well as to make her weapons "capable of rapid fire; a simple, rugged gun". Kamiya approved the idea, on the grounds that he felt the weapon would look "hot" in a female hand. Holsters were additionally considered for her feet, however the developers discarded the idea after feeling it wasn't feminine.

The concept of creating her outfit out of her hair was intended to fit into her design as a witch, which the development team felt meant she derived power from her hair. It was designed to both be a "means of adornment and protection" while also giving her appear "fashionable" and accentuate the movement of her limbs. During this process it was decided that as she summoned creatures to attack her enemies during the game she would lose partial control of her hair and end up in more "comfortable" attire; Shimazaki noted this as one of the aspects of the character she loved. Kamiya in addition wanted to avoid giving her large breasts and cleavage, feeling that normal sized breasts were adequate and that being mysterious was more attractive than "baring it all". The character's model was created by Kenichiro Yoshimura, who observed non-Japanese models to keep her proportions authentic, giving particular focus to her backside which, as a result, led to it being made wider and more rounded than the typically slim-hipped female characters designed by Japanese artists. While the character Jeanne came to be better liked by most of the team, Bayonetta was Shimazaki's favorite character, while Kamiya referred to her as his "ideal woman".

Her outfit in Bayonetta 2 was again designed by Shimazaki. It was generally designed more around straight lines than curves. All her jewelry and accessories were designed around this initiative apart from her glasses. There was debate about where to show skin, but when it was decided to create a cape at the front of the outfit, the front of her outfit was closed and instead they opted to show a large area of her back. For her new look, blue became a key color as opposed to the first game, where it was red: this was because water was a key theme for the second game and Hashimoto requested blue to become the design's key color. This eventually proved difficult as, combined with the black and silver incorporated into her outfit and the game's general color palette, it did not have the sharp qualities of her former appearance. Shimazaki described trying to make her stand out in her black outfit as "a nightmare". Her overall design theme was "solid". The character's hairstyle underwent a major redesign. Hashimoto's main reason behind this was that "[Bayonetta's] personality is the type that would not want to remain stagnant. She would want to change her style, taste in fashion, and her costumes. Down the line in the series, she may make further changes to her appearance." The texture of her outfit was designed to appear similar to leather, despite it still being made from her hair. Her new guns, Love is Blue, were also difficult to design, as making them too large or too similar in color to other elements of Bayonetta's outfit would not have fitted her. In the end, they were made a more striking shade of blue, as well as being given some gold to match Bayonetta's chestpiece and a silver sheen. Each of the guns, Toccata, Prelude, Nocturne and Minuet, were given antique charms adorned with flower designs and named according to their color and the ideas they evoked to further promote and augment the new look.

Portrayal
Bayonetta is voiced by Hellena Taylor in English and Atsuko Tanaka in Japanese. For the original game, despite production being based in Japan, Kamiya was particular to insist that the character have an English voice actor, and had no Japanese voice actor assigned due to his belief that speaking Japanese would not suit the character. Tanaka first voiced the character in the anime Bayonetta: Bloody Fate, an adaptation of the original Bayonetta, and subsequently assumed the role in Bayonetta 2 and the re-release of the original game on Wii U. Tanaka also voiced the character in commercials for the original game in 2009. She was chosen due to the fact that her name kept cropping up when the team asked who could best portray the character in Japanese.

For Bayonetta 3, the character's English voice was recast, a decision originally attributed by co-director Yusuke Miyata to "various overlapping circumstances"; Tanaka returned to reprise her role in Japanese. Taylor contested Miyata's statement on Twitter, alleging that the reason for leaving the role was Platinum offering her a flat rate of $4,000 for the role; an amount she found "insulting" given the series' commercial success. Her statements, combined with responses to it, prompted online controversy. However, several investigative reports disputed the story, with sources claiming that Taylor was offered a rate of $4,000 per session, for a total of 5 sessions. The role was given to Jennifer Hale, a veteran voice actress known for her work in the Mass Effect and Metal Gear series. Commenting on fan concerns surrounding the change, Miyata stated that Hale's performance was "way beyond what we could have imagined."

Appearances

Bayonetta series
Bayonetta was born in Vigrid from the forbidden union of Lumen Sage Balder and Umbra Witch Rosa: the Witch was imprisoned and the Sage exiled from his clan. Bayonetta's birth caused a rift between the formally peaceful clans and eventually led to them engaging in a war. Bayonetta became a black sheep among the Umbran Witches, and during the war, Jeanne, her former childhood friend and rival, sealed her away and wiped her memory to protect her from those who would exploit her power. For the next five hundred years, Bayonetta was sealed in a coffin at the bottom of a lake until she finally awakens from her sleep.  A journalist,  Antonio Redgrave, happens to be at the lake and is then murdered by Balder's angels who later got killed by Bayonetta as his son, Luka, looks on.

In Bayonetta, the witch sets out for her hometown Vigrid, where Balder is preparing to awaken the creator Jubileus and trigger the creation of a new world at the cost of the old one. She is followed there by a now grown-up Luka, who has become a journalist and has set out to show Bayonetta to the world, as an act of vengeance for her supposed part in his father's death. She also encounters Jeanne, who is under Balder's control, and Cereza, Bayonetta's younger self sent through time by the Lumen Sage. Cereza and Bayonetta become close, with Cereza thinking Bayonetta was her mother and Bayonetta eventually telling Cereza that she should keep things she treasured close to her heart (referring specifically to a charm Cereza's mother had given her as a birthday present). Eventually, Bayonetta learns the truth of recent events after defeating Balder and sending Cereza back to her own era: the "Left Eye" is actually Bayonetta herself, and regaining her memories allowed her to awaken her latent power. By bringing Cereza into the present, Balder set events into motion that would prevent Bayonetta from forgetting her past when Jeanne sealed her away. Knocked unconscious by the awakening of her power, Bayonetta is sealed within Jubileus by Balder, only to be rescued by Jeanne, newly freed from the Lumen Sage's control. Together, the two destroy Jubileus and save the entire universe from the Second Armageddon.

In Bayonetta 2, a few months after the events of the first game, Bayonetta and Jeanne are fighting an angel outbreak when a supernatural summoning goes wrong and Gomarrah kills Jeanne. Bayonetta then sets out to rescue Jeanne's soul from the realm Inferno, heading to the sacred mountain Fimbulventr to find the Gates of Hell. Arriving at the town of Noatun, she encounters a mysterious boy named Loki who serves as her guide to the mountain. She also reunites with Luka, who tells her about the legend of the deity Aesir, who created and ruled the Chaos Realm (Human Realm). During their journey, the pair is attacked by a masked Lumen Sage who targets Loki. When they reach the Gates of Hell, Bayonetta meets Loptr, who is apparently working with the Masked Lumen and knows Loki very well. Through a vision, he reveals to her that her father Balder was not responsible for the witch hunts and tried to save her mother, who was killed by an unknown assailant who looks like Loki. To escape their attackers, Bayonetta and Loki flee into Hell, but the Masked Lumen follows them. Separated from the boy, Bayonetta fights through hordes of demons and successfully rescues Jeanne but finds Loki being attacked again by the Masked Lumen. Intervening, Bayonetta fights the Sage, revealed to be a younger version of her father Balder who had been targeting Loki for Rosa's murder. Suddenly, Loki unwillingly sends both Bayonetta and Balder back into the past during the Witch Hunts. Bayonetta meets her mother Rosa, and the two of them fight against the angels. During the battle, she fights a younger version of Loptr, and she realizes that he murdered Rosa and framed Loki for the crime. Later encountering Balder, the pair enter the Umbra Witch sanctuary to find that Loptr had killed Rosa. When he escapes, Bayonetta tells Balder that the killer was not Loki. She then opens a time portal and the two of them return to the present. With the help of Jeanne flying a fighter jet, Bayonetta and Balder set out for Fimbulventr to confront Loptr, who has captured Loki. He reveals that he and Loki are the two halves of Aesir. When Aesir divided his power into the Eyes of the World, he split his soul into two: Loki being the good half and Loptr being the evil half. But Loptr decided to take back his power and become Aesir once again. Draining Loki of his power, Loptr takes the Eyes from both Bayonetta and Balder and transforms into Aesir. While the Witch and the Sage team up to fight Aesir, Loki erases the Eyes and weaken Loptr. Bayonetta and Balder defeat Loptr and split his soul from his body. When he tries to escape into the past to be reborn, Balder stops him by sealing the soul inside his body, despite Loki warning that it will corrupt him. Bayonetta tearfully bids farewell to her father as he is transported back into the past and becomes the corrupted Balder. As Loki begins to fade, he promises to Bayonetta that they will meet again when he is reborn.

Other appearances

At the 2009 Electronic Entertainment Expo (E3), Sega chose Penny Drake to model as Bayonetta after auditioning 100 women. To promote the character and the game, Playboy featured several models dressed as her for viewers to vote which they considered the best. Sega also joined men's lifestyle website Maxim.com to run a contest to find women who looked like Bayonetta; the grand prize winner was Andrea Bonaccorso. A Spanish cosplayer known as "Judy Helsing" portrayed Bayonetta as she appeared in Bayonetta 2 for Playboy.

Bayonetta starred in the anime film Bayonetta: Bloody Fate, an adaptation of the first Bayonetta game. She also appears as a downloadable character in Sega's multiplayer fighting game Anarchy Reigns, and as a special guest character alongside Jeanne and Rodin in Nintendo's action game The Wonderful 101.

On December 15, 2015, Bayonetta was announced as the final downloadable character for Super Smash Bros. for Nintendo 3DS and Wii U. Following a Nintendo-sponsored fan poll asking for character suggestions for the game, Bayonetta was the most popular choice among "negotiable" characters worldwide, placing among the top five vote-getters in the United States and placing first in the polls in Europe. She sports her primary character designs from both Bayonetta and Bayonetta 2 with her design from the second game being her default appearance, and retains many of her abilities from both games, such as extended combos, Witch Time, and Infernal Climax. She was released alongside a stage based on the falling Umbra Clock Tower from Bayonetta on February 3, 2016, in North America and on February 4, 2016, in Europe. Both the character and stage return in the sequel Super Smash Bros. Ultimate, this time in the initial release.

Hideki Kamiya was approached about having Bayonetta included in Project X Zone 2, to which he refused as he wanted Bayonetta and Dante from Devil May Cry to meet "on his own terms". However, he has stated that he has come to regret this decision due to realizing how the fans would have loved the two interacting, and that if there is a Project X Zone 3 he would be all for Bayonetta's inclusion.

Bayonetta also appears in 8-Bit Bayonetta, a free game that SEGA released on 1 April 2017 on Steam. The game's achievements led players to a "coming soon" page, with a countdown that ended with the release of the first game on PC.

Reception
Critical response to Bayonetta's character has been mainly positive. Computer and Video Games praised her as more interesting than the game's storyline, describing her as the "sexiest collection of pixels [they've] ever seen", though not a character they considered a sex object. They further compared her to "Lara Croft without the prudishness, Rubi from Wet played with honest sexuality", and one of the most memorable characters they'd seen. GamesRadar stated the character deserved plenty of respect, describing her as "sexy, witty and can certainly handle herself in a fight" and further named her one of the game's most positive points as she "kicks all sorts of ass and is funny too." GamePro felt that the character's "overt sexuality and frantic anime-inspired shenanigans" hampered the game's presentation, adding they would have enjoyed the character more if less focus had been put on her sexuality.  IGN's Ryan Clements described the character as a "hardcore badass" that was also "brimming with sexual energy", further describing her as an "immensely powerful protagonist". However, associate editor Nicole Tanner disagreed, noting she did not find the character's sexuality at all empowering as "just because you give a girl an attitude and guns isn't enough to offset what she looks like". Other members of IGN's staff named her their favorite video game character, describing her as "the playfulness and versatility of Dante" combined with "visually inventive combat". They cited her constant nudity as a point of appeal, calling the mechanic of her hair serving as her clothing both one of the stupidest and one of the coolest elements of a character. Kotakus Ash Parrish commended her design at Bayonetta 3 and remarked on her braids.

In 2012, the staff of GamesRadar ranked her as the 100th best hero in video games. The same site later listed her as the 17th best character from her generation. Larry Hester of Complex ranked her as the 19th hottest video game character in 2012, and as the 20th "most badass" video game character of all time in 2013. Lisa Foiles of The Escapist named Bayonetta's boots as the craziest footwear in video games, saying she was "totally okay with the absurdity of these." In 2014, La Nueva España included the "as beautiful as lethal" Bayonetta among the top ten sexiest video game characters of both genders. Thanh Niên ranked her in 2015 as the 18th most sexy female character.

Upon the release of Bayonetta 2 in 2014, Bayonetta's design received both widespread approval but also criticism from some reviewers. Polygon's Arthur Gies praised the developers for giving Bayonetta "some much-needed development as a human being who cares about things other than herself; her motivations go beyond the agonizingly trope-y amnesia setup of the first game", he was significantly concerned about other aspects of her depiction, such as gratuitous camera angles that were "frequently provided as an implicit reward for doing well. … It's sexist, gross pandering, and it's totally unnecessary." He felt that such issues "cause[d] an otherwise great game to require a much bigger mental compromise to enjoy". Edge stated that although "Bayonetta's default design shows how to walk the tightrope between sexy and sexualised", certain optional costumes "range from the respectable to the cringeworthy." GameSpot review by Mark Walton found the character praiseworthy: "[D]espite suffering crotch shots and blatant innuendos …[Bayonetta] remains one of the most charismatic and powerful heroines in the medium. There are none of the sleazy moments that peppered the likes of Lollipop Chainsaw and Killer Is Dead; the sexualisation here serves to empower, not to belittle." In an editorial for The Guardian on female characterization, Ria Jenkins praised Bayonetta as a character who is "unapologetically feminine, sexual and confident. Dismissed by many as an objectified fantasy, she is a woman without compromise who refuses to be ashamed of her body." 

In 2018, Lady Gaga expressed her love of the character, referring to her as "tough." In 2020, Lady Gaga released a music video for "Rain On Me" containing several references to Bayonetta.

See also

List of female action heroes
List of fictional witches
 Gender representation in video games

References

Bayonetta
Action-adventure game characters
Dancer characters in video games
Female characters in video games
Fictional characters who have made pacts with devils
Fictional characters with amnesia
Fictional characters with energy-manipulation abilities
Fictional characters with evocation or summoning abilities
Fictional characters with superhuman durability or invulnerability
Fictional deicides
Fictional demon hunters
Fictional female martial artists
Fictional gunfighters in video games
Fictional martial artists in video games
Fictional nuns
Fictional Spanish people in video games
Fictional witches
Science fantasy video game characters
Sega protagonists
Shapeshifter characters in video games
Super Smash Bros. fighters
Video game characters introduced in 2009
Video game characters who can move at superhuman speeds
Video game characters who use magic
Video game characters with slowed ageing
Video game characters with superhuman strength
Woman soldier and warrior characters in video games